Moondance is a 1970 album by Van Morrison.

Moondance may also refer to:

Events
 Moondance International Film Festival, an annual film competition in Boulder, Colorado
 Moondance Jam, a classic rock festival in Minnesota

Music
 "Moondance (Van Morrison song)", a song from the album of same name
 An instrumental by Nightwish from the album Oceanborn
 "Moon Dance", a song by Andreas Vollenweider from the 1986 album Down to the Moon

Other
 Moondance, a 1995 Irish drama film
 "Moon Dance" (Frasier), an episode in the third season of the sitcom Frasier
 Moondance (magazine), a women's literature and arts journal
 Moondance Diner, a New York landmark
 MS Moondance, a ferry
 Moon Dance, common name of the cultivated plant Buddleja crispa 'Huimoon' = Moon Dance

See also
 Dancing at the Harvest Moon, a 2001 television film